Nizhnyaya Veduga is a rural locality (a selo) and the administrative center of Nizhnevedugskoye Rural Settlement, Semiluksky District, Voronezh Oblast, Russia. The population was 1,418 as of 2010. There are 27 streets.

Geography 
Nizhnyaya Veduga is located 31 km northwest of Semiluki (the district's administrative centre) by road. Gnilusha is the nearest rural locality.

References 

Rural localities in Semiluksky District
Zemlyansky Uyezd